The 2006–07 Texas A&M–Corpus Christi Islanders men's basketball team represented Texas A&M University–Corpus Christi in the 2006–07 NCAA Division I men's basketball season. The Islanders, led by eighth-year head coach Ronnie Arrow, competed as members of the Southland Conference.  They played most of their home games at American Bank Center in Corpus Christi, Texas. They finished the season 26–7, 14–2 in Southland play to atop the conference standings. As the No. 1 seed, they defeated Southeastern Louisiana, McNeese State, and Northwestern State to win the Southland tournament. They received the conference’s automatic bid to the NCAA tournament as the No. 15 seed in the Midwest Region, where they lost in the opening round to Wisconsin. This was the programs first appearance in the NCAA Tournament.

Roster

Schedule and results

|-
!colspan=9 style=| Exhibition

|-
!colspan=9 style=| Non-conference Regular season

|-
!colspan=9 style=| Southland Conference season

|-
!colspan=9 style=| Southland tournament

|-
!colspan=9 style=|NCAA tournament

Source

Awards and honors
Chris Daniels  Southland Conference Player of the Year

References

Texas A&M–Corpus Christi Islanders men's basketball seasons
Texas AandM-Corpus Christi Islanders
Texas AandM-Corpus Christi Islanders men's basketball
Texas AandM-Corpus Christi Islanders men's basketball
Texas A&M-Corpus Christi